X, The Life and Times of Malcolm X is an opera with music by Anthony Davis and libretto by Thulani Davis, to a story by Christopher Davis. It is based on the life of the civil rights leader Malcolm X.

Performance history
The opera premiered in a full production at the American Music Theater Festival in Philadelphia, PA on October 9, 1985 and was subsequently revised and expanded for a production at the New York City Opera on September 28, 1986. The latter was listed as the world premiere in accordance with an agreement made between then-NYCO artistic director Beverly Sills, and AMTF directors Eric Salzman and Marjorie Samoff. The Oakland Opera Theater performed the work in June 2006. New York City Opera presented an abridged concert version on May 12, 2010 at the Schomburg Center for Research in Black Culture. It is scheduled for the 2023-24 season at New York's Metropolitan Opera, premiering in November 3, 2023.

Roles
Malcolm (baritone)
Elijah/Street (high tenor)
Louise/Betty (soprano)
Ella (mezzo-soprano)
Reginald (bass-baritone)
Young Malcolm Little (boy soprano)

Recordings
Gramavision: Orchestra of St. Lukes, William Henry Curry, conductor (recorded in 1989, issued in 1992)

References

1986 operas
Cultural depictions of Malcolm X
English-language operas
Opera world premieres at New York City Opera
Operas
Operas about politicians
Operas by Anthony Davis
Operas set in the 20th century
Operas set in the United States
Political operas